William Colclough (died c. 1414), of Newcastle-under-Lyme, Staffordshire and Calverhall, Shropshire, was an English politician.

He was a Member (MP) of the Parliament of England for Newcastle-under-Lyme in November 1384, 1385, 1386, January 1390, 1395 and January 1397.

References

14th-century births
1414 deaths
English MPs November 1384
English MPs 1385
English MPs 1386
English MPs January 1390
English MPs 1395
English MPs January 1397
Members of the Parliament of England for Newcastle-under-Lyme
Politicians from Shropshire